Ellands is a locational given surname that is popular among citizens of the United Kingdom and Eastern Canada. The name is pronounced usually as "ELLE—ands" in Canada, and as "EEL—ands" in the United Kingdom. It originated in the 18th century in Europe and it means "beautiful girl". As of 1999, there are an estimated 10,000 with this surname in the UK and Canada; specifically Hampshire, Ireland, Ontario, Quebec, Nova Scotia and Prince Edward Island

See also
 Elland, a market town in England

References

External links 
Directory of different name databases (archived)

Surnames